Piero Schlesinger  (19 May 1930 – 14 March 2020) was an Italian jurist, banker, lawyer and academic who served as president of the Banca Popolare di Milano from 1971 to 1993.

Career 
Piero Schlesinger graduated in jurisprudence in Turin. In 1956 he began his academic career at the University of Urbino and, two years later, personally chosen by its dean and founder Father Agostino Gemelli, moved to the Università Cattolica del Sacro Cuore of Milan, where he held the chair of private law for over three decades.

Among his pupils were lawyers Giuseppe Lombardi and Franco Anelli.

Alongside his academic commitments, Schlesinger continued to practice both civil and corporate law, and held important positions in Italian banking institutions. He joined the board of directors of the Banca Popolare di Milano following the shareholders' meeting of March 14, 1964. In 1971 he succeeded  as the head of the institute, becoming president on March 13. Il Sole 24 Ore wrote that during his presidency, the longest-serving in BMP's history, Schlesinger "made the institution [...] a key benchmark of Lombardy's economy".

Personal life and death 
Schlesinger had a lifelong marriage with child psychotherapist , with whom he had two children.

He died from complications related to COVID-19 on 14 March 2020, at the Policlinico of Milan, where he had been hospitalized 10 days before for unrelated health reasons.

Honours and awards 
 : Knight Grand Cross of the Order of Merit of the Italian Republic (22 January 1976)
 : Italian Medal of Merit for Culture, School and Art (2 July 1979)

References

External links 
 
 

1930 births
2020 deaths
20th-century Italian lawyers
Italian bankers
Jurists from Naples
Deaths from the COVID-19 pandemic in Lombardy
Knights Grand Cross of the Order of Merit of the Italian Republic
Recipients of the Italian Order of Merit for Culture and Art
Academic staff of the Università Cattolica del Sacro Cuore
University of Turin alumni
Academic staff of the University of Urbino
20th-century jurists
21st-century jurists